North Penn Junior/Senior High School  is one of three secondary facilities that make up the Southern Tioga School District. The school serves around 300 students in grades 7-12 and as a total of about 40 Faculty and Staff personnel.

School History and Future
The School itself was built in 1935, was renovated in 1990, and structural addition was placed in 1996. Currently  (2011-12 School Term), North Penn is going through another renovation project which will reconfigure the school as well as the feeder school, Blossburg Elementary and eliminating the need for modular classrooms as well as the 1935 wing.

The Hippo
The historic and legendary character of The Hippo was formed here. Created by junior high students, This orange rubber bathtoy took a personality and legend of its own here, and continues to be appreciated in the schools of North Penn-Mansfield Junior/Senior High School and North Penn-Liberty Junior/Senior High School.

Alma Mater
The Alma Mater for NP  was written by Will George Butler 
Our Alma Mater, North Penn High
A fond salute to thee,
We hail with pride the blue and white,
And strive to do and be.
The hardest lesson of our school
Is working out the golden rule,
And with this rule we'll win the fight;
All hail the blue and white.

The emblem of sincerity
When hearts beat strong and true,
Is visioned in the firmament
In clear and azure blue.
And all the rainbow's brilliancy
Betokened faith and purity,
When blended by the spell of light;
All hail the blue and white.

We'll ne'er forget life's golden hours
Beneath the blue and white;
And precepts learned will point the road
To ev'ry vantage height.
And as we walk the King's Highway,
The voice of duty we'll obey,
For "Right is might", "Let there be light",
All hail the blue and white.

Graduation Requirements
All Students wishing to Graduate from North Penn must complete the following coursework, as well as complete a Graduation Project, as mandated by Pennsylvania Law.
 English - 4.0 credits
 Social Studies - 4.0 credits
 Mathematics - 4.0 credits
 Science - 4.0 credits
 Communications - 2.0 credits
 World Language - 1.0 credit
 Health & Physical Education - 3.0 credit
 Community Service - 1.0 credit
 Electives - 3.0 credits

Athletics
North Penn participates in PIAA District IV:
 Basketball - Class A
 Football - Class A
 Track and Field - Class AA

References

Schools in Tioga County, Pennsylvania
Education in Tioga County, Pennsylvania
Public high schools in Pennsylvania
Public middle schools in Pennsylvania
1935 establishments in Pennsylvania